Randall William Bennett (born June 9, 1962) is an American college basketball coach and the current head men's basketball coach at Saint Mary's College of California.  He has led the team to several second-place finishes and nine NCAA tournament appearances, culminating in regular season conference championships in 2011, 2012, 2016 and 2023 as well as WCC tournament championships in 2010, 2012 and 2019.

Early life and college playing career
Born in Mesa, Arizona, Bennett graduated from Westwood High School in Mesa and began his collegiate career at Mesa Community College, playing under his father Tom from 1980 to 1982. Bennett then transferred to the University of California, San Diego (UC San Diego). As a senior in the 1984–85 season, Bennett averaged 7.0 points and 1.5 rebounds. Bennett graduated from UC San Diego in 1986 with a bachelor's degree in biology.

Coaching career
While completing his degree at UC San Diego, Bennett began his coaching career in the 1985–86 season as an assistant coach at the University of San Diego under Hank Egan. Bennett then coached at Idaho under Tim Floyd from 1986 to 1988. After two seasons at Idaho, Bennett returned to the University of San Diego and rejoined Egan's staff as an assistant coach. In 1994, Brad Holland replaced Egan and retained Bennett, until Bennett left in 1996 to be assistant at Pepperdine under Lorenzo Romar.

In 1999, Bennett followed Romar to Saint Louis.

Bennett became a head coach for the first time in 2001 when Saint Mary's College of California hired him. Inheriting a team that won only two games the previous season, Bennett improved his team's win–loss totals every season until 2004–05, when Saint Mary's went 25–9 with a berth in the NCAA tournament. Bennett has led Saint Mary's to the NCAA Tournament in 2008, 2010, 2012, 2013, 2017, 2019, 2022 and 2023 and National Invitation Tournament in 2009, 2011, 2014, 2015, 2016, 2018 and 2021.

Given this success, Bennett has been linked to several coaching jobs in higher profile conferences in recent years, most recently at California, Oregon State, Oregon, and Utah of the Pac-12.

Coach Bennett signed a ten year extension with Saint Mary's Gaels through 2026–27.

Head coaching record

References

External links
 Saint Mary's profile

1962 births
Living people
American men's basketball coaches
American men's basketball players
Basketball coaches from Arizona
Basketball players from Arizona
College men's basketball head coaches in the United States
Guards (basketball)
Idaho Vandals men's basketball coaches
Mesa Thunderbirds men's basketball players
Pepperdine Waves men's basketball coaches
Saint Louis Billikens men's basketball coaches
Saint Mary's Gaels men's basketball coaches
San Diego Toreros men's basketball coaches
Sportspeople from Mesa, Arizona
UC San Diego Tritons men's basketball players